The 11th Golden Raspberry Awards were held on March 24, 1991, at the Hollywood Roosevelt Hotel to recognize the worst the movie industry had to offer in 1990.

Awards and nominations

Films with multiple nominations 
The following films received multiple nominations:

See also

1990 in film
63rd Academy Awards
44th British Academy Film Awards
48th Golden Globe Awards

External links

 Razzie Awards 1991 on imdb

Golden Raspberry Awards
Golden Raspberry Awards ceremonies
Golden Raspberry Awards
Golden Raspberry Awards
Golden Raspberry Awards
Golden Raspberry Awards